Onake Obavva (18th Century) was a Karnataka hindu warrior who fought the forces of Hyder Ali single-handedly with a pestle (Onake) in the kingdom of Chitradurga of Karnataka, India. Her husband was a guard of a watchtower in the rocky fort of Chitradurga. In the state of Karnataka, she is celebrated along with Abbakka Rani, Keladi Chennamma and Kittur Chennamma, as the foremost women warriors and patriots. She belonged to the Holayas (Chalavadi) community.

Heroics of Obavva
During the reign of Madakari Nayaka, the city of Chitradurga was besieged by the troops of Hyder Ali (1754-1779).  A chance sighting of a man entering the Chitradurga fort through a hole in the rocks led to a plan by Hyder Ali to send his soldiers through that hole. The Guard (Kahale Mudda Hanuma, who was on duty near that hole) had gone home to have his lunch. During his meal he needed some water to drink, so his wife Obavva went to collect water in a pot from a pond which was near the hole in the rocks, halfway up the hill. She noticed the army trying to enter the fort through the hole. She used the Onake or pestle (a wooden long club meant for pounding paddy grains) to kill the soldiers one by one by hitting them on the head and then quietly moving the dead without raising the suspicions of the rest of the troops. Mudda Hanuma, Obavva's husband, returned from lunch, was shocked to see Obavva standing with a blood stained Onake and several of the enemies' dead bodies around her. Later, the same day, she was found dead either due to shock or having been killed by the enemy soldiers. Though her brave attempt saved the fort this time, Madakari could not resist the attack by Hyder Ali during 1779, when the fort of Chitradurga was lost to Hyder Ali.

Legacy 
She is considered to be the epitome of Kannada female pride. The hole through which Hyder Ali's soldiers sneaked is called Onake Obavvana Kindi (kindi=hole) or Onake kindi. Her heroic effort is depicted in a famous song-sequence in Nagarahavu picture directed by Puttanna Kanagal. The sports stadium in Chitradurga - Veera Vanithe Onake Obavva Stadium, is named after her, and she is commemorated with a statue sculpted by Ashok Gudigar, erected in front of the District Commissioner’s office in Chittradurga

In popular culture 
The 2019 Kannada language historical drama film Chitradurgada Onake Obavva, starring Kannada actress Tara as Onake Obavva.

Actress Jayanthi played the role of Onake Obavva in the movie Nagarahaavu.

See also 
 Belawadi Mallamma
 Keladi Chennamma
 Abbakka Rani
 Kitturu Chennamma
 Household Stone Implements in Karnataka

References

Year of birth missing
Women in 18th-century warfare
Indian women in war
People from Chitradurga
18th-century Indian women
18th-century Indian people
Women from Karnataka
Military personnel from Karnataka